Rupert "Sevn" Thomas Jr. (born July 7, 1991) is a Canadian record producer, songwriter and singer. He has produced and written numerous hit songs including Rihanna's "Work", Drake's "Pop Style" and "Chicago Freestyle," Travis Scott's "Wake Up", Nicki Minaj's "Run & Hide", Giveon's "Heartbreak Anniversary", and numerous others. He also released a 2014 instrumental EP entitled Hidden Hand. As a youth, he performed as a singer under the stage name Suga Prince.

Early life
Rupert Thomas Jr. was born and raised in the Scarborough district of Toronto, Ontario. His parents were born in Jamaica. They both had their own sound systems (Lover's Choice and Love Choice International) and would often hold parties in their basement. Dancehall artist, Rappa Robert, is Thomas' uncle who would take him to studio sessions in Jamaica, including at UB40's studio. In grade 5, Thomas began making beats on a Korg Triton and in 2002, at ten years old, he released a single called "Too Young for Love" featuring Master T under the stage name, Suga Prince. The music video for that song featured a 12-year-old Ayesha Curry.

Thomas signed to Sony BMG around that time but eventually put his music career on hold after the label folded. He first met producer Boi-1da while working with Sony. During high school, Thomas continued making beats often at Sunny Diamonds' studio in Toronto. It was there that he reconnected with Boi-1da, who would become his mentor and frequent collaborator. In 2012, Thomas faced off against WondaGurl (another Boi-1da protege) at the Battle of the Beat Makers. The judges were unable to choose a winner.

Career

In 2013, Thomas began accruing production and songwriting credits including on Kelly Rowland's "Love Me Til I Die", Skeme's "No Time", and Ben Stevenson's "Opposites Attract". In 2014, Thomas produced Mobb Deep's "Low" before releasing his own instrumental EP, Hidden Hand, in April of that year. The EP featured co-production from Jordan Evans and Prezident Jeff.

In 2015 and 2016, Thomas co-produced (with Boi-1da and others) a series of songs that appeared on the Billboard Hot 100, including Drake's "10 Bands" (number 58) and "Pop Style" (number 16), and Rihanna's "Work" (number 1). Billboard credited him as one of seven producers "who brought dancehall back to the charts in 2016". That year, he also co-produced PartyNextDoor's "Don't Run", which reached number 22 on the Billboard Hot R&B Songs chart. In April 2016, he released the single "Can't Sleep Alone" featuring Australian singer, NYNE. He continued producing records in 2017 including Travis Scott's "Green & Purple", Kehlani's "Get Like", and GoldLink's "Pray Everyday".

In 2018, he produced tracks on numerous notable albums including Travis Scott's Astroworld ("Wake Up" and "Houstonfornication"), Nicki Minaj's Queen ("Run & Hide"), Lil Wayne's Tha Carter V ("Let It Fly"), and The Carters' Everything Is Love ("Friends").

Discography

EPs

Singles

Remixes

Songwriting and production

References

External links
Sevn Thomas on SoundCloud

1991 births
Living people
Black Canadian musicians
Canadian child singers
Canadian hip hop record producers
Canadian people of Jamaican descent
Canadian songwriters
Musicians from Toronto
People from Scarborough, Toronto